Jacobus Petrus Burger is a South African politician who has been the lone Freedom Front Plus member of the Eastern Cape Provincial Legislature since February 2023.

Background
Burger was born in Hartswater in the Northern Cape. He has been a resident of the Eastern Cape for nearly three decades and is an environmentalist by profession. He is also a co-founder of the  organisation Water Warriors in Nelson Mandela Bay. Burger is a member of the provincial management committee of the Freedom Front Plus.

Provincial Legislature
Burger was sworn in as a Member of the Eastern Cape Provincial Legislature on 28 February 2023. He succeeded Theo Coetzee who died early-January 2023. Burger is the lone member of the FF+ in the provincial legislature.

References

Living people
Year of birth missing (living people)
Afrikaner people
People from the Eastern Cape
Members of the Eastern Cape Provincial Legislature
Freedom Front Plus politicians